James X. Zhang is an American health economist and health services researcher at the University of Chicago known for his innovative approaches in exploring complex data to measure a range of factors influencing healthcare delivery and outcomes.

Zhang initially worked with Nicholas Christakis, and the products included a novel methodology for identifying married couples in the Medicare claims to study mortality, morbidity, and health care use among the married elderly, and a novel claims-based dataset exploiting substantial cross-set linkages to study end-of-life care.

Zhang's research addressed the significance of comorbidity in clinical setting, and was among the most frequently cited papers in the field. His contributions have also included some other influential studies in the field of Medicare Part D program, and generic drug use. His more recent contributions with David O. Meltzer includes a novel method identifying patient with cost-related medication non-adherence using a big-data approach. His most recent contribution aims to advance the understanding of gender's role in healthcare behaviors and outcomes and the role of age advancement in health-related behavioral changes.

Zhang has also contributed to the advancement of understanding regarding patterns of concentration in healthcare spending and in drug utilizations. He showed that the concentration of healthcare spending is present even in patient populations with the same high-cost condition, such as heart failure, and that varying comorbidities are one substantive contributor to such concentration. He has also shown that, regarding the relationship between market mechanisms and drug prices, the observed positive relationship between the decreasing utilization of brand-name drugs and their increased prices can be explained in part by increases in market concentration of the brand-name drugs, despite the competition from generic drugs.

In addition, Zhang has made contributions that advance the understanding of the role of health insurance with respect to quality of and access to care among older patients with diabetes (a high-cost, high-resource-utilization patient population). His research demonstrated that insurance plays a more variable and nuanced role than commonly thought. He showed that while those without insurance are the least likely to meet quality-of-care measures, provision of health insurance such as Medicaid alone is not necessarily sufficient for the delivery of high-quality care.

Beyond econometric and statistical approaches, Zhang has contributed to the health sciences by introducing and applying machine-learning techniques to prognostic modeling for patients with lung cancer. His research showed that, while the traditional statistical approach and machine-learning approach have similar performance in identifying the most important predictive variables, the order of variable importance is more robust in the machine-learning model than in traditional statistical models regarding the differential functional forms of the variables.

References

External links 
 

Year of birth missing (living people)
Living people
Health economists
American economists
 University of Chicago faculty